Lloyd Douglas Ferreira (born 6 May 1974) is a former South African cricketer.  Ferreira was a right-handed batsman and a left-arm medium pace bowler.

Ferreira made his first-class debut for Boland in the 1993–94 season against the touring Australians. Ferreira would go on to represent the team 25 times in first-class matches from 1993–94 to 1996–97, where he would score 958 runs at a batting average of 19.55, with 26 half centuries and a single century high score of 127.

Ferreira made his List-A debut for Boland against Orange Free State in the 1994–95 Benson and Hedges Series.  During his time with Boland, he represented the team in 35 List-A matches from 1994–95 to 1996–97, where he scored 1,141 runs at an average of 33.55.  He made 2 centuries and 7 half centuries and made a high score of 125*.

With the departure of West Indian Desmond Haynes, the call-up of Gary Kirsten to the South African team and the inevitable call-up of Herschelle Gibbs, Western Province were in need of a new opening batsman.  Ferreira was signed by the province for the 1997–98 season, where he made his first-class debut for the province against Free State.  During his time with Western Province, Ferreira played 4 first-class matches for the Western Province B team.  For the main team, he played 38 matches during which he scored 1,930 runs at an average of 32.16, with 5 centuries and 8 half centuries.  He also made his highest first-class score for the province, 201 against North West in 2001. He played his final first-class match for the province against KwaZulu-Natal in the 2003–04 SuperSport Series.

Ferreira also played List-A cricket for Western Province, making his one-day debut against Griqualand West in the 1997–98 Standard Bank League.  He played 45 one-day matches for the province, scoring 999 runs at an average of 24.97, with a 6 half centuries and a single century score of 134.  His final one-day match for the province came against Easterns in the 2003–04 Standard Bank Cup.

In 1998 he represented Dorset in England, in the 1998 NatWest Trophy against Hampshire.  Ferreira scored 7 runs, before being dismissed by Nixon McLean in what his only appearance for the English county. In 1999, he played 4 matches for Rawtenstall Cricket Club in the Lancashire League.

References

External links
Lloyd Ferreira on Cricinfo
Lloyd Ferreira on CricketArchive
Matches and detailed statistics for Lloyd Ferreira

1974 births
Living people
Cricketers from Johannesburg
South African cricketers
Boland cricketers
Western Province cricketers
Dorset cricketers
South African people of Portuguese descent